Consort Rong (d. 26 April 1727) of the Manchu Plain Yellow Banner Magiya clan, was a imperial consort of  the Kangxi Emperor of the Manchu ruled Qing dynasty.

Titles 
During the reign of the Shunzhi Emperor (r. 1643–1661) or the Kangxi Emperor (r. 1661–1722)
Lady Magiya ( from unknown date)
During the reign of the Kangxi Emperor (r. 1661–1722)
Concubine Rong (榮嬪; from August 1677)
Consort Rong (榮妃; from 1681)

Issue 
As concubine:
Chengrui (5 November 1667 – 10 July 1670), first son
Saiyinchahun (24 January 1672 – 6 March 1674), fourth son
Princess Rongxian of the First Rank (20 June 1673 – 29 May 1728), third daughter
Changhua (11 May 1674), sixth son
Changsheng (10 September 1675 – 27 April 1677), eighth son
Yunzhi, Prince Cheng (23 March 1677 – 10 July 1732), tenth (third) son

Life

Family Background 
Consort Rong came from the Manchu Plain Yellow Banner Magiya clan. Consort Rong's personal name and birth date were not recorded in history.

 Father: Gaise

She a descendant of Tuhai, a grand tutor of crown prince and  first class Zhongda duke.

Kangxi Era 
It unknown when Lady Magiya entered the palace and become a concubine of the Kangxi Emperor. It is very likely that she entered the palace before the wedding of Kangxi Emperor and Empress Xiaochengren.

Lady Magiya was the first concubine who bore children to the Emperor. On 5 November 1667, she gave birth to the Emperor's first son, Chengrui, who would die prematurely on 10 July 1670. On 24 January 1672, she gave birth to the Emperor's fourth son, Saiyinchahun, who would die prematurely on 6 March 1674. On 20 June 1673 she gave birth to his third daughter, Princess Rongxian. On 11 May 1674 she gave birth to his sixth son, who died shortly after his birth. On 10 September 1675 she gave birth to his eighth son, who died prematurely on 27 April 1677. On 23 March 1677 she gave birth to his tenth (third) son, Yunzhi.

Lady Magiya is one of the two consorts who gave birth to the most children for Kangxi Emperor, the other is Empress Xiaogongren.

In August 1677, after Lady Niohuru became empress, Lady Magiya and 3 other concubine were promoted to the rank of "Imperial Concubines".

In December of the 20th year of Kangxi (1681), Lady Tong was elevated to "Imperial Noble Consort"and Lady Maigiya and 3 other concubines were promoted to ''Consort".

Emperor Kangxi had a decree that after his death, the princes could welcome their mothers home to live, but they still had to enter the palace every month to personally greet the Emperor Yongzheng and pay respects to empress.

Yongzheng Era 
In the first year of the Yongzheng reign, Lady Magiya moved to Yunzhi, Prince Cheng's manor.

In the fifth year of the Yongzheng reign, Consort Rong died outside the palace.

See also 

 Royal and noble ranks of the Qing dynasty
 Imperial Chinese harem system

References 

 "Manuscripts of Qing History · Biography I · Empresses"

1727 deaths
Year of birth unknown
Manchu people
17th-century Chinese women
17th-century Chinese people
Consorts of the Kangxi Emperor